Herbert Franz Mataré (22 September 1912 – 2 September 2011) was a German physicist. The focus of his research was the field of semiconductor research. His best-known work is the first functional European transistor, which he developed and patented together with Heinrich Welker in the vicinity of Paris in 1948, independent from the Bell Labs engineers who had developed the first transistor shortly before. The final 20 years of his life Mataré split time between his homes in Hückelhoven, Germany and Malibu, California. He was born in Aachen.

Biography 
Mataré completed his studies in mathematics, chemistry, electrochemistry, nuclear physics, and solid-state physics at the Technical University of Aachen with degree "Diplom-Ingenieur" in Applied Physics. In addition, he studied mathematics, physics, and chemistry at the University of Geneva.

In 1939 he joined the Telefunken research laboratory in Berlin. At that time it became obvious that the miniaturization of vacuum tubes had met a  technical limit and that alternative solutions had to be sought using solid state circuits and the principles of the earlier transistor inventions of Julius Edgar Lilienfeld, Oskar Heil, Walter Schottky, and Robert Wichard Pohl.

Because of the air raids on Berlin in 1943, the Telefunken laboratory was moved to the Cistercian abbey in Lubiąż (Leubus) Silesia, where Mataré focused on improving the cm-wave (SHF) receiver sensitivity.

In 1944, as the Soviet army closed in, the site and most of its equipment were abandoned and the operation was transferred to Thuringia. Later Mataré taught physics and mathematics in Wabern near Kassel and gave lectures at the Aachen university, and he was invited to build a semiconductor diode plant for Compagnie des Freins et Signaux Westinghouse in Aulnay-sous-Bois near Paris.

Academic degrees

Important work 
Independently of American work, the German researchers Mataré and Heinrich Welker developed the first operational French transistor at Compagnie des Freins et Signaux Westinghouse in Aulnay-sous-Bois near Paris during the years 1945 to 1948. They filed their first transistor patent application on 13 August 1948. This European invention was presented to the public on 18 May 1949 as the "Le Transistron".

In 1951/1952, Mataré founded Intermetall in Düsseldorf, the first company to offer diodes and transistors.

Awards (selection) 
 Life Fellow IEEE
 Member emeritus New York Academy of Sciences
 Eduard Rhein Ring of Honor, Eduard Rhein Foundation, 2008.

Literature

Patents 
The following list can only present a part of the more than 80 patents which Mataré has filed.

Controversial views

Mataré contributed articles to the scientific racist journal Mankind Quarterly. In his book Conscientious Evolution (1982) he discussed a broad range of topics including genetic engineering, eugenic measures, controlled procreation, sterilization and capital punishment. Matare's ill-advised articles and text were poorly formulated and lacking in scientific basis. The anthropologist H. James Birx described the book as deeply prejudiced, "neither a careful examination of the promise of human genetics nor a contribution to the science of organic evolution."

References

External links 
 
 Peter Salomon: „Deutsche Halbleiter-Technik vor 1945 ?“
 
 
 Armand van Dormael: "The „french“ transistor" at cdvandt.org, retrieved 22-09-2013 
 

1912 births
2011 deaths
20th-century German physicists
20th-century German inventors
RWTH Aachen University alumni
University of Geneva alumni
Academic staff of RWTH Aachen University